Calliope is a children's program that showed various live-action and animated short films. These often included European features and shorts such as Cosgrove Hall's "Cinderella" and "The Pied Piper of Hamelin", and FilmFair's Paddington.

Overview
The series consisted of various short films, framed around an old man named Gene (voiced by Eugene Francis) and his dog Eliza viewing them. Twice an episode, pictures of kids from across the United States were shown in "Gene's Pix of the Week". Gene would also pose two questions to viewers; those who submitted their answers to an address would receive a Calliope balloon.

Short films
In its early years, Calliope obtained many of its short films from Learning Corporation of America and Phoenix Films. Other shorts featured on Calliope included:

 A Visit to Apple Cider Country (1977, Canada)
 The Boyhood of Thomas Edison (1977, USA)
 Britannica's Tales Around the World (1991, USA)
 Clever Hiko-Ichi (1974, USA/Japan)
 Come See the Dolphins (1974, USA)
 Dinosaur (1980, USA)
 Emily and the Three Little Old Ladies (1980)
 The Happy Tuesday Recycling Jug Band Truck (Revisited) (1976, USA)
 Henry's Cat (1983–87, UK)
 Kids on Smoking (1979, USA)
 King Rollo (1980, UK)
 The Legend of Sleepy Hollow (1972, USA)
 Lilliput Put
 Little Train, Little Train (1972, USA)
 Mr. Hiccup
 Sacajawea (1990, USA)
 The Tender Tale of Cinderella Penguin (1981, Canada)
 The Universe and I (1976–77, USA)
 Victor & Maria (1982, UK)
 The Wizard's Son (1981, USA)
 The World According to Nicholas (1980)

See also
Pinwheel on Nickelodeon
Big Bag on Cartoon Network
List of animated short series

References

External links
 

1970s American animated television series
1980s American animated television series
1990s American animated television series
1970s American anthology television series
1980s American anthology television series
1990s American anthology television series
1978 American television series debuts
1993 American television series endings
American children's animated anthology television series
American television series with live action and animation
English-language television shows
USA Network original programming